Between 1870 and the early 20th century, "a distinguished group of board schools" were built in the area covered by the present city of Brighton and Hove on the south coast of England.  All were designed and built by the local firm of Thomas Simpson & Son, whose members were Scottish architect Thomas Simpson (1825–1908) and his Brighton-born younger son Gilbert Murray Simpson  (1869–1954).  John William Simpson, the older of Thomas's two sons, may also have been involved with some of the work.

There was no nationally coordinated scheme of primary-level education until the Elementary Education Act 1870 was passed; this empowered local councils to form school boards with elected members and funded by rates.  Brighton's population was growing rapidly at the time, and many new schools were needed.  Thomas Simpson was appointed architect and surveyor to the Brighton School Board in 1871 and held the same positions with the Hove School Board from 1876.  In 1878, Brighton School Board merged with that of the neighbouring parish of Preston to form the Brighton and Preston School Board, and Simpson became the architect and surveyor of this new entity.

Many of the schools were large buildings of "excellent" architectural quality, situated in rapidly expanding suburban areas such as Round Hill, Queen's Park and Prestonville.  Thomas Simpson and his son, who became a partner in the firm in 1890, used a range of materials—characteristically red brick, terracotta and pebbledashing—and their preferred style evolved from Queen Anne Revival on the early schools towards a more elaborate "Edwardian Free style".  The final school, St Luke's (1903), has been described as "the culmination of [Thomas Simpson's] career".  , it was one of five with Grade II listed status.  Some of the schools have been demolished, while others have closed and are now in residential use or are owned by other educational institutions (some were acquired by Brighton Polytechnic and Brighton College of Technology during the 20th century); but several remain in use as primary schools.  Finsbury Road School was threatened with demolition in 1999 but was granted listed status and thereby saved; and the York Place Elementary Schools were nearly destroyed by bombing in 1940 during the Brighton Blitz.

After its formation, the Brighton School Board also took over a small number of existing schools and schoolrooms based in chapels.  Also within the Board's remit were industrial schools for persistent truants.  The first, established in a former workhouse in the village of Chailey in 1875, moved seven years later to a house in Patcham.  The second, in Mile Oak near Portslade, was built in conjunction with the London School Board.

Board schools
The "Date" column gives the date of completion of the building.
The "Grade" column gives the listed building status if applicable.
All schools were built by Thomas Simpson or (from 1890) Thomas Simpson & Son except those marked (†), which were built prior to the 1870 Education Act and were taken over by the school board as a result of the Act.

Schoolrooms and Industrial schools

When the Brighton School Board was founded in 1870, it took over two schoolrooms based in Nonconformist chapels in inner suburban areas.  One was at the London Road Chapel on Belmont Street, which dated from 1830 and which was used by the Countess of Huntingdon's Connexion until 1881, after which it adopted a Congregational character.  Thomas Simpson had extended the building early in his career, in 1856–57.  The chapel was demolished in 1976, 18 years after its closure.  The other was at Belgrave Street Congregational Chapel in Hanover—a building which still stands, albeit not in religious use.  This was another of Thomas Simpson's buildings: he designed it in either 1859 or 1865 in a stuccoed Early English Gothic Revival style.  It included a schoolroom from the beginning, and this was in continuous use until 1942—thereby outlasting the school board.  The building became an annexe of Brighton Polytechnic, then was turned into flats in the late 1990s.

The Brighton and Preston School Board acquired a former workhouse in Chailey, East Sussex in 1875 and converted it into the Brighton and Preston Board Industrial School for Boys.  It was registered on 9 June 1875.  The 18th-century building is Grade II-listed and is now part of Chailey Heritage School.  The new Brighton and Preston School Board Industrial School, at Purley Lodge in Patcham, received its industrial school certification on 12 October 1882 but closed in 1905.

At Mile Oak Road between Portslade and Mile Oak was the Brighton Town and London County Council Industrial School for Boys, later known as Portslade Industrial School and then Mile Oak Junior Approved School for Boys.  This was built and funded jointly by Brighton and Preston School Board and the London School Board.  It received its industrial school certification on 3 May 1902 and was built at a cost of £30,000.  The annual running costs, reported as £3,342 in 1904, were split equally between the two councils.  The "handsome structure of red brick" had above its entrance a distinctive sculpture of a boy with an open book on his knees.  Following a final name change to the Mile Oak Community Home in 1971, the institution closed on 31 August 1977 and the site was cleared for housing.  Only the entrance lodges remain.

See also

List of Birmingham board schools
List of schools in Brighton and Hove

References

Notes

Bibliography

History of education in the United Kingdom
Defunct schools in Brighton and Hove
Lists of schools in South East England